Zerumbone synthase (ZSD1) is an enzyme with systematic name 10-hydroxy-alpha-humulene:NAD+ oxidoreductase. This enzyme catalyses the following chemical reaction

 10-hydroxy-alpha-humulene + NAD+  zerumbone + NADH + H+

The enzyme was cloned from shampoo ginger, Zingiber zerumbet.

References

External links 
 

EC 1.1.1